Maisamma IPS is a Telugu film starring Mumaith Khan and Sayaji Shinde in lead roles. This film is about a strict police-woman, who is a defender for the people, since the law do justice to them. The film's story is written by director Dasari Narayana Rao. The film is directed by Bharath Parepalli.

Plot
A girl child is born to a helpless mother when the jatara (a public religious festival) of Goddess Maisamma is going on in a Telangana village. The child is named as Maisamma. Her parents are killed in a natural calamity. The child is taken care of by her sister Durga. A small-time rowdy Sadhu (Sayaji Shinde) marries Durga and forces her to do prostitution for his political ambitions. At one stage, the rowdy tries to rape minor girl Maisamma. While both sister run for their life, Sadhu prompts his dogs to kill his wife Durga, while Maisamma escapes. She later becomes a police officer Maissamma IPS (Mumaith Khan). She lives for one goal to kill those who is responsible for her sister's miserable life followed by her death. Then she killed all peoples who was responsible for her sister's death. She use many getups to do it. She use cowherd getup to kill minister. She also mastered  in kungfu and karate. In this film all stunts are performed by mumaith khan.

Cast
Mumaith Khan as Maisamma IPS
Sayaji Shinde as Minister Sadhu
Ranjitha as Durga
Pradeep Rawat as Khan bhaiyya
Raghu Babu as Sadhu's Brother in law
Jeeva as Corrupted Policeman
M. S. Narayana as Minister
L. B. Sriram as Constable Basha
Satya

Music
"Chup Saala" - M. M. Srilekha, Viswa
"Bajjomante" - Ganga
"Maisamma" - S. P. Balasubrahmanyam
"Gandara Gandabie" - Deepu, Kalpana Patowary
"Mathrudevobhava" - M. M. Srilekha
"Naa Peru Mumaith Khan" - Suchitra

Reception
Rediff wrote that "Stay away from the film unless you want to spoil your day". Sify gave the film a verdict of "Avoidable".

References

External links
 

2008 films
2000s Telugu-language films
Indian action films
Fictional portrayals of the Andhra Pradesh Police
2008 action films
Films scored by M. M. Srilekha